Leucospermum harpagonatum is an evergreen trailing shrublet with leathery, line-shaped, upright leaves and small heads with eight to ten cream, later carmine-colored, strongly incurved flowers assigned to the family Proteaceae. It is reminiscent of the hottentot fig without its flowers. It is called McGregor pincushion in English and flowers from late August till early November. It is critically endangered and occurs only in a very small area in the Western Cape province, South Africa.

Description 
The flowering branches are reddish, initially finely powdery but soon becoming hairless,  in diameter, and bear many stalked flower heads. The upper surface of the leathery leafblade is somewhat concave, with slightly incurved margins.

These involucral bracts are set in approximately three whorls.

The style is cream to carmine in colour, tapering towards the tip, and the upper half has barbs pointing to the base. The style ends in a thickened portion, to which the pollen has been transferred in the bud, called the pollen presenter, which is curved inwards and cone-shaped with a pointy tip and a distinct collar at its base. The minute groove that functions as the stigma can be found at the very tip of the pollen presenter. The ovary is about ½ mm (0.02 in) long, coverered in very fine straight silky hairs pressed to its surface and gradually merges into the style.

Differences with related species 
L. harpagonatum is a close relative of Leucospermum hamatum. Both are low and far spreading shrubs with upright leaves, small heads with only relatively few flowers in a single whorl, very small barbs pointing to the base on the upper outside end of the styles, and the upper end of the perianth tube inflated. L. hapagonatum has line-shaped, entire leaves without teeth, generally eight to ten flowers per head, subtended by an involucre of 25–35 bracts and densely woolly perianth tubes. L. hamatum however has narrowly lance-shaped leaves with mostly three teeth, generally four to seven flowers per head, which is subtended by an involucre of three to four bracts or the involucre may be absent, but with four or five conspicuous bracteoles subtending individual flowers.

Taxonomy 
The McGregor pincushion was first discovered for science in 1993 by Tony Rebelo and Fiona Powrie. The following year, South African botanist and Proteaceae specialist John Patrick Rourke described it as Leucospermum harpagonatum.

Together they make up the section Hamatum. The inflated perianth tube suggest the species of the section Hamatum might be close relatives of those in the section Tumiditubus.

The species name harpagonatum is compounded from Latin the word harpago ("grappling hook") and the suffix -atum indicating the likeness of something, for the likeness of the flower head with a grappling hook.

Distribution, habitat and ecology 

The flowers are initially cream-colored, but change to carmine after pollination. The flowers do not smell, but a lange amount of nectar gathers in the inflated perianth tube. Rodents chew on the perianth tube, presumably to help themselves to the nectar, and in doing so probably pollinate it. The fruits are collected by native ants for the pale edible elaiosome, which is eaten in the underground nest, where the seeds remain until they germinate after an overhead fire.

Conservation 
The McGregor pincushion is considered critically endangered, because there is only one population, consisting of about 200 specimens, that grows in an area of less than 2 km2. The population is declining due to the harvesting of cut flowers, urban development, a too high frequency in which the local fynbos is burnt down and because an alien invasive ant species has forced out the native species, but contrary those native ants, does not bury the seeds, so these are unprotected against the fire.

References

External links 
 several photos

harpagonatum
Endemic flora of South Africa
Plants described in 1994